Stibara rufina is a species of beetle in the family Cerambycidae. It was described by Francis Polkinghorne Pascoe in 1858. It contains the varietas Stibara rufina var. laosensis.

References

Saperdini
Beetles described in 1858